The slender slider (Pletholax gracilis) is a species of lizard in the family Pygopodidae.

Geographic range
Pletholax gracilis is endemic to coastal areas of southwestern Australia.

References

Legless lizards
Pletholax
Reptiles described in 1864
Taxa named by Edward Drinker Cope
Pygopodids of Australia